Artūras Karnišovas (born April 27, 1971) is a Lithuanian professional basketball executive and former player. He is the current executive vice president of basketball operations of the Chicago Bulls of the National Basketball Association (NBA).

Early life and college career
Karnišovas was born in Klaipėda to Mykolas, a basketball player, and Irena. Karnišovas started his career in Lithuania, with Statyba Vilnius, while in high school, and played there until 1990. His father also played for Statyba and they are the only father-son duo to play for the team at some point in their careers. Expressing an interest in playing and studying in the United States, Karnišovas earned an invitation to play college basketball at Seton Hall University following a recommendation of Šarūnas Marčiulionis to Seton Hall head coach P. J. Carlesimo during the 1990 FIBA World Championship. Karnišovas was the first player from the USSR to play in an American college, and arrived there without knowing a single word of English. In four years playing for the Seton Hall Pirates, Karnišovas helped the team win two Big East tournaments and qualify for the NCAA tournament four straight times, being the only player to start for all squads.

Professional playing career
After trying and failing to draw interest from a National Basketball Association (NBA) team, Karnišovas began playing overseas. His former college coach, P. J. Carlesimo, attributed his inability to play in North America to insufficient scouting and a more guaranteed financial return in Europe. Karnišovas is one of the few players to have played in Europe's four strongest national domestic league championships, Spain (for FC Barcelona), Italy (Fortitudo Bologna), Greece (Olympiacos Piraeus), and France (Cholet). He reached the EuroLeague's EuroLeague Final Four three times, and led the 1998–99 EuroLeague season in free throw percentage (89.6%). He was chosen as FIBA's European Player of the Year in 1996, by FIBA Basket magazine.

National team career
Karnišovas helped lead the senior men's Lithuanian national basketball team to consecutive bronze medals at the Summer Olympic Games in 1992 and 1996. He also played at the 1998 FIBA World Championship. He also played at the EuroBasket 1995, where he won a silver medal, at the EuroBasket 1997, and at the EuroBasket 1999.

Post-playing career
Karnišovas worked for the National Basketball Association's basketball operations office from 2003 to 2008, and afterwards became an international scout for the Houston Rockets for five years, while also directing the Adidas Eurocamp—a preparation tournament for European players picked in the NBA draft—in 2011 and 2012.

On July 16, 2013, he became the assistant general manager of the Denver Nuggets.

Karnišovas was considered one of the top candidates to be the new general manager for the Brooklyn Nets in 2016. In 2017, Karnišovas emerged as one of the candidates for the general manager position for the Milwaukee Bucks. On June 6, 2017, he remained as one of their three last original candidates, along with Wes Wilcox and Justin Zanik. On June 13, 2017, it was announced that only Karnišovas and the Bucks' interim general manager Justin Zanik remained as top candidates for the position. Two days later, on June 15, 2017, the Nuggets made Karnišovas their new general manager, with Tim Connelly moving up to become the team's president of basketball operations. The Bucks would eventually promote their director of basketball operations, Jon Horst, for their vacant general manager position instead. His first notable signing as a general manager was a multi-year contract with Paul Millsap on July 13, 2017. On February 15, 2019, Karnišovas signed a multi-year contract extension with the Nuggets.

On April 13, 2020, Karnišovas was named executive vice president of basketball operations by the Chicago Bulls.

Personal life
Karnišovas is married to Gina, whom he met at Seton Hall, and they live in Chicago, with their three sons. The family previously resided in North Jersey and Englewood, Colorado.

Awards and achievements

College
Haggerty Award: (1994)

Professional
 FIBA European Selection: (1995)
 EuroLeague Finals Top Scorer: (1996)
 EuroLeague All-Final Four Team: (1996)
 3× Spanish League champion: (1996, 1997, 2001)
 FIBA Basket Magazine's European Player of the Year: (1996)
 3× Spanish League All-Star: (1996, 2001 I, 2001 II)
 FIBA EuroStars MVP: (1997)
 3× FIBA EuroStar: (1997, 1998, 1999)
 FIBA EuroStars MVP: (1997)
 McDonald's Championship Finalist: (1997) 
 Greek League All-Star (1997)
 Italian Supercup winner: (1998)
 FIBA EuroStars Top Scorer: (1999)
 Italian League champion: (2000)
 Spanish King's Cup winner: (2001)

Lithuanian senior national team
 2× Summer Olympic Games:
  (1992, 1996)
 EuroBasket:
  (1995)

References

Notes

Sources

External links
 
 Artūras Karnišovas at fibaeurope.com 
 Artūras Karnišovas at euroleague.net
 Artūras Karnišovas at legabasket.it 
 Artūras Karnišovas at acb.com 

1971 births
Living people
1998 FIBA World Championship players
Basketball players at the 1992 Summer Olympics
Basketball players at the 1996 Summer Olympics
Basketball players from New Jersey
BC Statyba players
Chicago Bulls executives
Cholet Basket players
Denver Nuggets executives
Lithuanian expatriate basketball people in France
Lithuanian expatriate basketball people in Greece
Lithuanian expatriate basketball people in Italy
FC Barcelona Bàsquet players
Fortitudo Pallacanestro Bologna players
Liga ACB players
Lithuanian men's basketball players
Lithuanian expatriate basketball people in Spain
Lithuanian expatriate basketball people in the United States
Lithuanian expatriate sportspeople in France
Lithuanian expatriate sportspeople in Greece
Lithuanian expatriate sportspeople in Italy
Medalists at the 1992 Summer Olympics
Medalists at the 1996 Summer Olympics
National Basketball Association scouts from Europe
Olympiacos B.C. players
Olympic basketball players of Lithuania
Olympic bronze medalists for Lithuania
Olympic medalists in basketball
Seton Hall Pirates men's basketball players
Small forwards
Soviet expatriate sportspeople in the United States
Soviet men's basketball players
Basketball players from Klaipėda